Federico Perego (born 29 September 1984) is an Italian basketball assistant coach for Vanoli Cremona in the Lega Basket Serie A (LBA).

Career
Federico Perego started his coach-career managing the youth sector of Pallacanestro Lissone and Aurora Desio from 2000 to 2008.

He later started a long career as assistant-coach of many clubs like Veroli Basket, Aurora Desio, Pallacanestro Cantu (in Serie A) and Fulgor Omegna.

In 2014 Perego became an assistant coach for Andrea Trinchieri in the German club Brose Bamberg of the Basketball Bundesliga. In early 2018 he was assistant coach also for Luca Banchi and in June 2018 for Ainars Bagatskis.

On 13 January 2019 he became head coach for the first time in his career of Brose Bamberg.

On 14 June 2019 Perego signed a deal with the Italian club VL Pesaro. On 5 December 2019 he was replaced by Giancarlo Sacco, after succeed to get any win at his first 12 games with the club.

On 1 July 2021 Perego was appointed by Vanoli Cremona as assistant coach of Paolo Galbiati.

Honours and titles
Assistant coach
Basketball Bundesliga: 3
Brose Bamberg (2015, 2016, 2017)
Head coach
German basketball Cup: 1
Brose Bamberg (2019)

References

External links
Profile at easycredit-bbl.de 

1984 births
Living people
Brose Baskets coaches
Italian basketball coaches
Italian expatriate basketball people in Germany
Victoria Libertas Pesaro coaches
People from Lissone